Downward is an English surname. Notable people with the surname include:

Alfred Downward (1847–1930), Australian politician
Herbert Downward (1880–1973), Australian politician
Julian Downward (born 1960), British biochemist
Peter Downward (1924–2014), British Army officer

English-language surnames